Zhang Ai (born September 23, 1981 in Shanghai) is a female Chinese softball player. She competed at the 2004 Summer Olympics.

In the 2004 Olympic softball competition she finished fourth with the Chinese team. She played all eight matches as infielder.

External links
profile

1981 births
Living people
Chinese softball players
Olympic softball players of China
Sportspeople from Shanghai
Softball players at the 2004 Summer Olympics
Softball players at the 2008 Summer Olympics
Asian Games medalists in softball
Softball players at the 2006 Asian Games
Softball players at the 2002 Asian Games
Medalists at the 2002 Asian Games
Medalists at the 2006 Asian Games
Asian Games silver medalists for China
Asian Games bronze medalists for China